WVLT (92.1 FM, "Cruisin' 92.1") is a radio station licensed to Vineland, New Jersey.  The station is owned by Clear Communications, Inc. (not to be confused with Clear Channel Communications, Inc.)  It airs an Oldies music format.

This station had the call letters WKQV and WKQV-FM in the late 1970s and early 1980s. Call letters were changed to WVLT on August 15, 1986.

Personalities

"Doo-Wop Diner" host Lou Costello has been on-the-air in the Delaware Valley for more than 30 years. In April 2003, he was inducted into the membership of the Broadcast Pioneers of Philadelphia, an organization of 300 area broadcasters, all with at least 15 years experience in the business.

In October 2006, Bill "Wee Willie" Webber joined the WVLT airstaff. In November 2006 Webber was honored as "person of the year" by the Broadcast Pioneers of Philadelphia. Webber worked at WVLT until his death in May 2010, just a few weeks shy of his 81st birthday.

"Crazy Bob" Madara was a former morning drive personality on WVLT.

During Hurricane Isaias, WVLT's transmitter was struck by lightning and it caused some damage to the transmitting equipment.  It completely damaged the RDS which allows text to be broadcast through the stations signal to display on the radio that receives the signal and it damaged some of the transmitting equipment which caused the signal to become weaker even though it is broadcasting at full power.  There is no definitive date on when the equipment will be fully repaired yet.

References

External links
WVLT official website

Broadcast Pioneers of Philadelphia web page

VLT
Oldies radio stations in the United States
Cumberland County, New Jersey
Radio stations established in 1968